The Baltimore Orioles Radio Network comprises 39 stations in five states and the District of Columbia.

Beginning in 2022, the Orioles' flagship station is once again WBAL/1090 AM and is joined by sister station WIYY/97.9 FM; a game conflict with the Baltimore Ravens sees one station carrying the Orioles, and the other the Ravens. The contract is for six years. Geoff Arnold, Brett Hollander, Melanie Newman and Scott Garceau are the Orioles' radio voices who are part of a rotation in which two broadcasters work each game. All 162 regular-season baseball games are currently broadcast throughout the network.

Affiliates

(Updated as of January 6, 2023.)

Delaware

District of Columbia

Maryland

North Carolina

Pennsylvania

Virginia

West Virginia

See also
List of XM Satellite Radio channels
List of Sirius Satellite Radio stations

References

Radio Business Report article on WBAL reacquiring Orioles broadcasts

Baltimore Orioles
Major League Baseball on the radio
Sports radio networks in the United States